Daraa (Levantine Arabic: , also Darʿā, Dara’a, Deraa, Dera'a, Dera, Derʿā and Edrei; means "fortress", compare Dura-Europos) is a city in southwestern Syria, located about  north of the border with Jordan. It is the capital of Daraa Governorate, historically part of the ancient Hauran region. Nearby localities include Umm al-Mayazen and Nasib to the southeast, Al-Naimah to the east, Ataman to the north, al-Yadudah to the northwest and Ramtha, Jordan to the southwest.

According to the Syrian Central Bureau of Statistics, Daraa had a population of 97,969 in the 2004 census. It is the administrative center of a nahiyah ("sub-district") which contains eight localities with a collective population of 146,481 in 2004. Its inhabitants are predominantly Sunni Muslims.

Daraa became known as the "cradle of the revolution" after protests at the arrest of 15 boys from prominent families for painting graffiti with anti-government slogans sparked the beginning of Syrian Uprising of 2011.

History

Ancient history
Daraa is an ancient city dating back to the Canaanites. It was mentioned in Egyptian hieroglyphic tablets at the time of the Pharaoh Thutmose III between 1490 and 1436 BC. It was known in those days as the city of Atharaa. It was later referred to in the Hebrew Bible as Edrei or Edre'i (אֶדְרֶעִי), the capital of Bashan, site of a battle where the Israelites defeated the city's king, Og. According to Jewish tradition, Eldad and Medad were buried in Edrei.

Classical era
In the Greek Seleucid Empire, and later the Roman Empire into which it was incorporated by Trajan in 106, the city was known as Adraa (Ἀδράα), the name used on its coinage. It was incorporated into the province of Arabia Petraea. 

By the 3rd-century, it gained the status of a polis (self-governed city). Roman historian Eusebius referred to it by Adraa calling it a famous polis of Arabia. The area east of Adraa was a centre of the Ebionites. Adraa itself was a Christian bishopric. Arabio, the first bishop of Adraa whose name is now known, participated in the Council of Seleucia of 359. Uranius was at the First Council of Constantinople in 381; Proclus at the anti-Eutyches synod of Constantinople in 448 and the Council of Chalcedon in 451; and Dorimenius at the Second Council of Constantinople in 553. No longer a residential bishopric, Adraa is today listed by the Catholic Church as a titular see. It was also a centre of monastic and missionary activity in the Syrian Desert. 

In 614, the Sasanian Persians sacked Adraa during the Byzantine–Sasanian War of 602–628, but spared the inhabitants.

Islamic era
According to Ibn Hisham and al-Waqidi, 9th-century biographers of the Islamic prophet Muhammad, the Jewish Banu Nadir and Banu Qaynuqa tribes immigrated to Adhri'at following their expulsion from Medina. However, Historian Moshe Sharon dismisses that assertion citing the absence of their claims in any Jewish sources and earlier Muslim reports.  Situated between the major Jewish centres of Palestine and Babylonia, Adhri'at nonetheless had a large Jewish population by the early 7th century and served as a place of Jewish learning. Its residents lit an annual bonfire on Rosh Hashannah in a signal to Babylonia's Jewish communities that the religious new year began.

Early Muslim historian Ahmad al-Baladuri lists Adhri'at as one of the towns that surrendered to the Muslim army following the Battle of Tabuk in 630, while Muhammad was alive. Consequently, the inhabitants paid jizya tax. However, Baladhuri's account was believed to have been a mistake. Instead, contemporary sources maintain that Adhri'at was conquered by the Rashidun army during the caliphate of Abu Bakr in 634. Adhri'at's residents reportedly celebrated the arrival of the second caliph Umar ibn al-Khattab when he visited the city, "dancing with swords and sweet basil." Throughout Rashidun and Umayyad rule, the city served as the capital of the al-Bathaniyya subdistrict, part of the larger Jund Dimashq ("military district of Damascus.")

In 906, the population was massacred in a raid by the rebellious Qarmatians. The late 10th-century Arab geographer al-Muqaddasi noted that during the Abbasid period, Adhri'at was a major administrative center on the edge of the desert. He claimed the city was part of the Jund al-Urdunn district and that its territory was "full of villages" and included the region of Jerash to the south of the Yarmouk River.

Throughout the Middle Ages, it served as a strategic station on the hajj caravan route between Damascus and Medina and as the gate to central Syria. The Crusaders briefly conquered Adhri'at, then known as Adratum, during the reign of Baldwin II of Jerusalem in 1118.

According to Yaqut al-Hamawi, in the early 13th-century during Ayyubid rule, Adhri'ah was "celebrated for the many learned men who were natives of the place."

Later, under the Mamluks and the Ottomans, the city maintained its importance. In 1596 Daraa appeared in the Ottoman tax registers as Madinat Idra'a and was part of the nahiya of Butayna in the Qada of Hauran. It had an entirely Muslim population consisting of 120 households and 45 bachelors.  A 40% tax−rate was levied  on wheat, barley, summer crops, goats and/or beehives; a total of 26,500 akçe.

Modern era
By the 20th-century Adhri'at gained its modern name "Daraa." Following the Ottomans' construction of the Hejaz Railway, it became a chief junction of the railroad. In both his book Seven Pillars and a 1919 letter to a military colleague, T. E. Lawrence describes an episode on 20 November 1917 while reconnoitering Deraa in disguise when he was captured by the Ottoman military, heavily beaten, and sexually abused by the local Bey and his guardsmen. During the Battle of Megiddo, Lawrence led the Arab Revolt in cutting the southern rail line at Mafraq, the northern at Tell Arar, and the western by Mezerib. On 27 September 1918, the Arab Northern Army managed to capture Daraa from the retreating Ottoman forces.

Daraa is the southernmost city of Syria near the border with Jordan and a major midpoint between Damascus and Amman.

After the Syrian Ba'ath Party gained power following the 1963 coup, the new interior minister Amin al-Hafiz appointed Abd al-Rahman al-Khlayfawi as governor of Daraa until 1965.
Daraa had recently, before the Syrian Civil War, suffered from reduced water supply in the region and had been straining under the influx of internal refugees who were forced to leave their northeastern lands due to a drought exacerbated by the government's lack of provision.

Syrian Civil War

The city of Daraa played an important role by the start of the 2011 uprising against the government led by President Bashar al-Assad as part of the Arab Spring protests with thousands of people protesting in the city. The uprising was sparked on the 6th of March 2011, when 15 youths were arrested for scrawling graffiti on their school wall denouncing the Assad regime. The family and friends of the detained youths and many of their supporters marched on the streets on the 15th of March, demanding their release. According to activists, this protest was faced with Syrian security forces opening fire on the protesters killing three people. Protests continued daily. During this time the local courthouse, the Ba'ath party headquarters in the city, and the Syriatel building owned by Rami Makhlouf, a cousin of President Assad, were set on fire. What followed was a government assault on the city as violence continued and intensified all across Syria. On 25 April 2011, the Syrian military launched a large operation in Daraa in a crackdown on protesters. The operation lasted until 5 May 2011. In June 2011, United Nations investigators found that over 240 civilians had been killed.

On 16 February 2012, the Syrian Army reportedly attacked Daraa, shelling the city heavily. This was apparently because, "Daraa has been regaining its role in the uprising. Demonstrations resumed and the FSA provided  security for protests in some parts of the city." The attack was part of a security force push "to regain control of areas they lost in recent weeks", indicating that the FSA in Daraa had taken control of parts of the city. Security forces attacked at least three districts, but FSA fighters fought back, firing at Syrian Army roadblocks and buildings housing security police and militiamen. On 14 March 2012, the FSA controlled at least one main district in the city of Daraa (Al-Balad district) which made the Syrian army attack it by firing anti-aircraft guns into buildings of the FSA-controlled district.

In early June 2017, much of the city of Daraa was reported to have been destroyed by protracted fighting. On 12 July 2018, the battle for Daraa ended after several days of intense clashes between the Syrian Army and rebel forces, some of which agreed to terms of reconciliation. The Syrian Army retook the city fully. On 1 March, the 2020 Daraa clashes began.

Geography

Climate
Daraa has a cold semi-arid climate (Köppen climate classification BSk).

References

Bibliography

Further reading
T.E. Lawrence, (various editions) Seven Pillars of Wisdom, Chapter LXXX

External links
 Official Site of Daraa Governorate 
 s:Encyclopaedia Biblica/Ecclesiasticus-Eglon (king)#EDREI
Map of the town, Google Maps
Deraa-map; 22L

Cities in Syria
Populated places in Daraa District